The Roman Catholic Diocese of Campos is a diocese located in the city of Campos dos Goytacazes in the Ecclesiastical province of Niterói in Brazil.

History
On December 4, 1922 it was established as the Diocese of Campos from the Diocese of Niterói.

Bishops
The Bishops of Campos (Roman rite) are, in reverse chronological order:
Bishop Roberto Francisco Ferrería Paz (2011.06.08 – present)
Bishop Roberto Gomes Guimarães (1995.11.22 – 2011.06.08, retired)
Bishop João Corso, S.D.B. (1990.10.12 – 1995.11.22, resigned)
Bishop Carlos Alberto Etchandy Gimeno Navarro (1981.08.29 – 1990.05.09), appointed	Archbishop of Niterói, Rio de Janeiro
Bishop Antônio de Castro Mayer (1949.01.03 – 1981.08.29)
Archbishop (personal title) Octaviano Pereira de Albuquerque (1935.12.16 – 1949.01.03)
Bishop Henrique César Fernandes Mourão, S.D.B. (1925.05.01 – 1935.12.16), appointed Bishop of Cafelândia

Coadjutor bishop
Antônio de Castro Mayer (1948-1949)

Other priests of this diocese who became bishops
Fernando Arêas Rifan, appointed Coadjutor Apostolic Administrator of São João Maria Vianney, Rio de Janeiro in 2002
Luiz Henrique da Silva Brito, appointed Auxiliary Bishop of São Sebastião do Rio de Janeiro in 2012

References
GCatholic.org
Catholic Hierarchy

Roman Catholic dioceses in Brazil
Christian organizations established in 1922
Campos, Roman Catholic Diocese of
Roman Catholic dioceses and prelatures established in the 20th century
Roman Catholic bishops of Campos